Jure Zupan is a Slovenian physicist and founder of chemomectrics research in Slovenia, known for his work in applications and development of artificial neural networks in chemistry.

Life
Zupan was born in Ljubljana, Slovenia in 1943. He studied Physics at the University of Ljubljana and graduated in 1966. He obtained his PhD in Chemistry in 1972. He did his first research on the magnetic properties of solids at the Josef Stefan Institute, Ljubljana (1963–1973). In 1974 he has joined National Institute of Chemistry in Ljubljana to work on Computerized Databases, Chemometrics, and Artificial Intelligence. He did his post doctoral research at ETH Zürich (1975) and at NIH, Bethesda (1978).

Work 
Since 1985 he is a Full professor at the University of Ljubljana. He was Visiting Professor at the Arizona State University in Tempe, USA (1982), at the Vrije Universiteit Brussel, Belgium (1988), for 3 consecutive years (each year for three months) at the Technical University Munich, Germany (1990–1992), and at the University Rovira i Virgili, Tarragona, Spain (1995). After 1988 his research focused to the field of Artificial Neural Networks. He is now mostly interested in the multi-dimensional data representation and context extraction from large assembles of multi-dimensional data. He is member of the European Academy of Science (Salzburg) and member of the Engineering Academy of Slovenia.

Selected publications
Zupan is author and editor of 10 books and monographs and has co-authored more than 200 articles. With Johann Gasteiger he co-authored Neural Networks in Chemistry and Drug Design. The book received more than 500 citations and was nominated the book of the month in 1993.

Political career 
 Minister for Science and Higher Education of the Republic of Slovenia

References 

   2. Zupan, J.; (1982): Clustering of Large Data Sets, Research Studies Press, Wiley, ISBN 0471104558.

External links 
Official homepage

1943 births
Living people
Scientists from Ljubljana
Mathematical chemistry
Members of the European Academy of Sciences and Arts
University of Ljubljana alumni
Academic staff of the University of Ljubljana
ETH Zurich alumni
Slovenian physicists
Fellows of the American Physical Society